Sri Vaikanasam is one of Hinduism's protocol of Worship of God in temples and home, it was created by Lord Vikhanasar. Traditionally it is known as a Bhagavath Sastra as Sri Vikhanasar is created by Lord Sriman Narayana from His soul. This Agama has more than 15 million verses in Sanskrit detailing the worshipping rituals and procedures including the daily activities and annual Hindu festivities to be done at Hindu Temples.

Almost half of the temples in South India follow this protocol of Worship of their Hindu gods and goddesses. The other important Agama for Hindus is the 'pancharatra agama' which is laying down the worship protocol of Lord Vishnu at temples.

The famous temples of South India - Tirumala Tirupathi, Tiruvallikeni, Sri Villiputhoor, Thirumal irum cholai, Tirukovilur, Tiruneermalai, Gunaseelam, Tirukkadal Mallai, Tiruvidavendhai, Sri Oppiliappan koil, Tirukannapuram, Tiruvahindipuram and many other are following the Sri Vaikanasam-based Agamic rituals and procedures.

This is the first worship protocol foremost to all others (Pancharatham, etc.) which was begun for how to worship Lord Vishnu. This protocol has 8 divisions. Sri Vikhanasar has four disciples , namely "Athri", "Brughu", "Mareechi", "Kashyapar". One of the disciple started new protocols for saivam, etc.

Those that belong to this Bhagavath Sastra are known to be part of Sri Vaikanasa archaka society. They are having privilege to worship and be the Priests at Temples just by their birth and no special sanctity or qualification is required for them to enter priesthood.

External links
https://www.facebook.com/SriVaikhanasaAgama 

Hindu traditions